Château de Coulogne was a castle in Coulogne, Pas-de-Calais, France.

History
In 1214, the castle was slighted by Ferdinand, Count of Flanders.

The castle fell to the English in 1347. It was handed over to the English as part of the Treaty of Brétigny in 1360.

Francis, Duke of Guise ordered the destruction of the castle in 1558.

Citations

References
 
 

Châteaux in Pas-de-Calais